The 2018 Liga 1 U-16  (known as the Super Soccer TV Elite Pro Academy Liga 1 U-16 2018 for sponsorship reasons) was the first season of the Liga 1 Elite Pro Academy U-16. The league is currently the youth level (U-16) football league in Indonesia. The season started on 15 September 2018 and finished on 9 December 2018.

Persib U16s won the title on 9 December 2018 after defeating Bali United U16s 4–3 on penalties after 1–1 draw until extra time in the final.

First round
First round was the group stage and started on 15 September 2018. Group A and B played home and away double-game round-robin tournament while Group C played four-series home tournament with five matches for each series. The winners and runner-ups from each group along with two best third-placed teams advanced to second round.

Group A

Group B

Group C

Ranking of third-placed teams

Second round
Second round was the group stage and was played on 1–4 December 2018. All groups was played on a single-game round-robin home tournament. The winners and runner-ups from each group advance to semi-finals. The draw for the group was held on 26 November 2018.

Group X
This group was played at May 17th Stadium, Banjarmasin and Demang Lehman Stadium, Martapura.

|}

Group Y
This group was played at Kapten I Wayan Dipta Stadium, Gianyar and Gelora Samudera Stadium, Kuta.

|}

Knock-out round

Bracket

Semi-finals

|}

Third place

|}

Final

|}

See also
2018 Liga 1
2018 Liga 2
2018 Liga 3
2018–19 Piala Indonesia

References

Liga 1 U-16
Liga 1 U-16
Liga 1 U-16